Nassarawa-Eggon is a Local Government Area in Nasarawa State, Nigeria. Its headquarters is in the town of  Eggon.

It has an area of 1,208 km and a population of 149,129 at the 2006 census.

The postal code of the area is 960.

Eggon Local Government Area

Eggon LGA is headquartered in the town of Eggon and its consists of towns and districts of Ende, Ginda, Alizaga, Arugbadu, Bakyano, Eggon, Sako, Umme, Agunji, Alogani, Arikpa, Ezzen, Wakama, Angbaku, Buba, Galle, Gbamze, Ogbagi, Wogan and Ubbe.

References

Local Government Areas in Nasarawa State